Sherif Kamal Shahine is an Egyptian diplomat. Formerly the ambassador to Zambia, Shahine became his country's ambassador to Iraq on 22 June 2009. Shahine is the first Egyptian ambassador to Iraq since former ambassador Ihab al-Sharif was kidnapped and killed in July 2005.

References

Year of birth missing (living people)
Living people
Egyptian diplomats
Ambassadors of Egypt to Zambia
Ambassadors of Egypt to Iraq